"Thank You in Advance" is the second single from the album Nathan Michael Shawn Wanya by American vocal group Boyz II Men.

Track listing
 "Thank You in Advance"
 "Leaders of the Pack"

US Promo CD
 Thank You In Advance (Main) 	4:14 	
 Thank You In Advance (Instrumental) 	4:16 	
 Thank You In Advance (A Cappella) 	4:08 	
 Thank You In Advance (Call Out Hook) 	0:12

Charts

References

2000 singles
2000 songs
Boyz II Men songs
Music videos directed by Darren Grant
Songs written by Shep Crawford
Universal Records singles